ARJ (Archived by Robert Jung) is a software tool designed by Robert K. Jung for creating high-efficiency compressed file archives. ARJ is currently on version 2.86 for MS-DOS and 3.20 for Microsoft Windows and supports 16-bit, 32-bit and 64-bit Intel architectures.

ARJ was one of many file compression utilities for MS-DOS and Microsoft Windows during the early and mid-1990s. ARJ is well-documented and includes over 150 command line switches.

File format support in other software 
ARJ archives can be unpacked with various tools other than the ARJ software. There exists a free software re-implementation of the tool. A number of software utilities, including 7-Zip, Zipeg, and WinRAR can also unpack .arj files. For macOS, standalone utilities, such as DeArj and UnArjMac, are available.

See also 
List of archive formats
Comparison of file archivers

References

External links 
 ARJ Software
 Open-source ARJ

Archive formats
File archivers
Windows compression software
Data compression software
Data compression